The Black Friend: On Being a Better White Person is a 2020 nonfiction book written by Frederick Joseph.

References

2020 non-fiction books